Kemmelberg is a hill formation in Flanders, Belgium. It is located less than a kilometer from the village of Kemmel, part of the municipality of Heuvelland in West Flanders.

History
The earliest settlements on the Kemmelberg date back 2.500 years, when Celtic tribes of the Hallstatt culture populated the area. The hill takes its name from Camulos, the Celtic god of war.

During World War I, it was the location of one of the war's most ferocious battles. Because of its strategic importance, it was fiercely fought in the Fourth Battle of Ypres. On 25 April 1918, German imperial forces, hoping to force a breakthrough to the North Sea, started attacking the French troops on the Kemmelberg with gas grenades. At 6 a.m. the German Alpenkorps seized and captured the Kemmelberg, causing allied troops to withdraw from all the hills in the region. Thousands of French soldiers were slaughtered. Several streets and army barracks in Germany were named after this event (Kemmel-Privatweg in Magdeburg, Kemmelkaserne in Murnau). Friedrich Bertram Sixt von Armin and Prince Franz of Bavaria were commanders, but Karl Höfer was celebrated as hero of Kemmelberg - the Held vom Kemmelberge. It was recaptured during the Battle of the Peaks of Flanders in late September 1918, as a precursor to the Armistice of 11 November 1918.

Two war cemeteries are located to the northeast of the hill, the Kemmel Number 1 French Commonwealth War Graves Commission Cemetery and the Klein Vierstraat British Cemetery with the remains of World War I soldiers. At the top of the Kemmelberg there is a commemorative war memorial, the Monument aux soldats français, constructed in 1932 and inaugurated by French general and war hero Lacappelle. The memorial column is 17 meter high and depicts the Roman victory goddess Victoria. In the area, the monument is colloquially called "The Angel".

A NATO air defence command centre was based in an underground bunker on the southern edge of the hill in the 1950s.  This now operates as a visitors centre.

Cycling

The steep cobbled roads over the hill frequently feature in cycling races, especially in the Flemish spring classics. The climb is often a decisive location in Gent–Wevelgem, but is also regularly included in the Four Days of Dunkirk, the Three Days of De Panne, Three Days of West Flanders and the Tour de l'Eurométropole. In 1950 the Kemmelberg was included in the route of the World Championship, won by Belgian local and cycling icon Briek Schotte.

Gallery

References

External links 

 Die Eroberung des Kemmel - Bericht des deutschen Hauptquartiers aus dem Jahre 1918
 Fotos der Eroberung des Kemmelberges

Climbs in cycle racing in Belgium
Mountains and hills of Flanders
Heuvelland
Landforms of West Flanders